Stanislav "Stan" Bohonek (born December 28, 1952) is a Canadian former competitive figure skater. He represented Canada at the 1976 Winter Olympics in Innsbruck.

Early life 
Stanislav Bohonek was born December 28, 1952, in Prague, Czechoslovakia. His brother, Jan, was born about three years later. The family moved to Toronto, Ontario, Canada in 1968 due to the Warsaw Pact invasion of Czechoslovakia.

Skating career and later life 
Bohonek competed mainly in single skating. He also studied classical ballet and competed briefly in pair skating, appearing on the novice level with Jayne Elliott.

Bohonek won the bronze medal at the 1975 Canadian Championships. After repeating as national bronze medalist the following year, he was named in Canada's team to the 1976 Winter Olympics. He placed 14th in men's single skating at the event in Innsbruck, Austria.

In the 1976–77 season, Bohonek withdrew from the Ontario-Quebec divisionals due to a tender Achilles tendon in his left foot.

After graduating from the University of Toronto with a bachelor's degree in biology, Bohonek obtained a master's degree in biology at Cleveland State University. He then studied at Case Western Reserve University's dental school, graduating in 1987, and opened a private practice in Westlake, Ohio, in 1989. With his brother, he wrote and illustrated a children's book about dental health.

Competitive results

References

1952 births
Canadian male single skaters
Figure skaters at the 1976 Winter Olympics
Olympic figure skaters of Canada
Living people
Figure skaters from Prague
Figure skaters from Toronto
Czechoslovak emigrants to Canada
Canadian expatriates in the United States
Case Western Reserve University alumni